The Turung language (Tailung, Tairong) is an endangered Tai language spoken in seven villages in central Assam. Many Turung people now speak Assamese or Singpho languages.

The total population of the ethnic group is over 30,000 and primarily live in Jorhat, Golaghat and Karbi Anglong districts of Assam.

References

Sources
Morey, Stephen. 2005. The Tai languages of Assam: a grammar and texts. Canberra: Pacific Linguistics.

Southwestern Tai languages
Extinct languages of Asia
Languages of Assam